Özge Samancı (born 21 July 1975 in İzmir) is a Turkish American artist, and professor at Northwestern University. She creates media art installations and graphic novels. Her art installations merge computer code and bio-sensors with comics, animation, interactive narrations, performance, and projection art. Her installations use media arts to break down people's mental and emotional barriers and hear about environmental issues. Her graphic novels combine drawings with three-dimensional objects.

She is the author of Dare to Disappoint (Farrar Straux Giroux, 2015), an autobiographical graphic novel.

She won a 2017 Berlin Prize and 2020 Distinguished Alumna Award from Georgia Institute of Technology.

Life 
Ozge Samanci was born in 1975.  The daughter of two teachers, she grew up in the coastal city of Izmir, at a time when Turkey was under the control of a military dictatorship.

She studied mathematics at Boğaziçi University and published cartoons in humor and film magazines. She moved to the United States to pursue a Ph.D. on digital media at the Georgia Institute of Technology. Her interest in comics expended into visual arts and experimental media and she received an Andrew Melon Postdoctoral Fellowship in the Art Practice Department of University of California, Berkeley.

Graphic novels and comics 
Dare to Disappoint is Ozge Samanci's graphic coming-of-age memoir. Her story takes place after the third military coup leading to Turkey's rapid change to neo-capitalism from 1980 to 2000. After going through the struggle of obtaining a degree in mathematics to please her father and society, she becomes a cartoonist and artist. The book was translated into five languages. Her drawings have appeared in The New Yorker, The Wall Street Journal, Slate Magazine, The Huffington Post, Guernica, and The Rumpus. Samanci also runs Ordinary Things, an online comics journal with more than 2,000 comic-collage images depicting her daily observations.

Interactive art installations 
In You Are the Ocean, participants can control the installation's oceanic imagery with their minds.

Fiber Optic Ocean composes music generated by live data from sharks and humans.

Her interactive installations have been exhibited internationally, at the Siggraph Art Gallery, FILE festival, Currents New Media, The Tech Museum of Innovation, WRO Media Art Biennial, Athens International Festival of Digital Arts and New Media, Piksel Electronic Arts Festival, and ISEA.

Awards 
In 2017, Samanci won the Berlin Prize with her graphic novel project Not Here but Everywhere. Her graphic novel Dare to Disappoint won a Middle East award and 30th Annual New York Book Show Award and she was a guest at the Berlin Literature Festival.

References 

1975 births
Living people
American artists
American people of Turkish descent
Boğaziçi University alumni
Georgia Tech alumni
The New Yorker people
People from İzmir